78th NYFCC Awards
January 7, 2013

Best Picture: 
Zero Dark Thirty

The 78th New York Film Critics Circle Awards, honoring the best in film for 2012, were announced on 3 December 2012 and presented on 7 January 2013.

Winners

Best Film:
Zero Dark Thirty
Runners-up: Argo and The Master
Best Director:
Kathryn Bigelow – Zero Dark Thirty
Runners-up: Ben Affleck – Argo and Paul Thomas Anderson – The Master
Best Actor:
Daniel Day-Lewis – Lincoln
Runners-up: Jack Black – Bernie, Denis Lavant – Holy Motors, and Joaquin Phoenix – The Master
Best Actress:
Rachel Weisz – The Deep Blue Sea
Runners-up: Jessica Chastain – Zero Dark Thirty, Jennifer Lawrence – The Hunger Games and Silver Linings Playbook, and Emmanuelle Riva – Amour
Best Supporting Actor:
Matthew McConaughey – Bernie and Magic Mike
Runners-up: Tommy Lee Jones – Lincoln and Christoph Waltz – Django Unchained
Best Supporting Actress:
Sally Field – Lincoln
Runner-up: Anne Hathaway – The Dark Knight Rises and Les Misérables
Best Screenplay:
Tony Kushner – Lincoln
Runners-up: Wes Anderson and Roman Coppola – Moonrise Kingdom and Mark Boal – Zero Dark Thirty
Best Animated Film:
Frankenweenie
Runners-up: Brave and ParaNorman
Best Cinematography:
Greig Fraser – Zero Dark Thirty
Runner-up: Mihai Mălaimare Jr. – The Master
Best Foreign Language Film:
Amour • Austria / France / Germany
Runners-up: Holy Motors • France / Germany and Once Upon a Time in Anatolia (Bir Zamanlar Anadolu'da) • Bosnia and Herzegovina / Turkey
Best Non-Fiction Film:
The Central Park Five
Runners-up: The Gatekeepers and This Is Not a Film
Best First Film:
David France – How to Survive a Plague
Runner-up: Benh Zeitlin – Beasts of the Southern Wild

References

External links
 2012 Awards

New York Film Critics Circle Awards
New York
New York Film Critics Circle Awards
New York Film Critics Circle Awards
New York Film Critics Circle Awards
New York Film Critics Circle Awards